

Eanfrith (or Lanferthus) was a medieval Bishop of Elmham.

Eanfrith was consecrated before 758 and died sometime after that year.

References

External links
 

Bishops of Elmham